John Owusu (born 25 December 1925, date of death unknown) was a Ghanaian sprinter. He competed in the men's 4 × 100 metres relay at the 1952 Summer Olympics.

References

1925 births
Year of death missing
Athletes (track and field) at the 1952 Summer Olympics
Ghanaian male sprinters
Olympic athletes of Ghana
Place of birth missing